Big Black River Battlefield is the site of the Battle of Big Black River Bridge, fought May 17, 1863, as part of the Vicksburg campaign in the American Civil War.  It was listed on the National Register of Historic Places in 1971.

The site retains vestiges of Confederate and Union campsites, and of Union fortifications, and of Confederate defenses, and wreckage of ships CSS Charm and CSS Paul Jones remain.

A Big Black River Railroad Bridge, built at the site much later, in 1917, is listed on the National Register for its architecture.

References

Battlefields of the Western Theater of the American Civil War
Geography of Hinds County, Mississippi
Geography of Warren County, Mississippi
Mississippi in the American Civil War
American Civil War on the National Register of Historic Places
Conflict sites on the National Register of Historic Places in Mississippi
National Register of Historic Places in Hinds County, Mississippi
National Register of Historic Places in Warren County, Mississippi